Washington Monument State Park is a public recreation area located approximately  southeast of Boonsboro, Maryland. The park preserves the Washington Monument, a  tower honoring George Washington, the first President of the United States. The monument sits along the Appalachian Trail near the summit of South Mountain's Monument Knob. It was added to the National Register of Historic Places in 1972. The park is managed by the Maryland Department of Natural Resources.

History
Built in 1827, the original tower was the first monument dedicated to George Washington to be completed.  The Washington Monument in Baltimore was completed two years later, although it had been started considerably earlier in 1815.  The famous Washington Monument in the District of Columbia was not completed until 1885.

The dry-laid stone tower was built on July 4, 1827, by the citizens of Boonsboro who marched to the site en masse after assembling in the town square at 7 a.m.

Owen Brown was the son of Abolitionist John Brown and the highest ranking surviving, uncaptured member of the party assembled for John Brown's Raid on Harpers Ferry.  Owen led a party of five escapees from the failed raid to safety in the north. On or about the night of October 23, 1859 these men ascended the slope of South Mountain after circling around Turner's Gap to avoid the men and dogs lying in wait for them in the mountain pass.  To their astonishment, there on the crest of the mountain was an odd stone tower.  Owen Brown retold the experience during his only known interview in 1873, both he and the interviewer then still apparently unaware the men had stumbled upon Washington's Monument.

Although it was a popular meeting place for the citizenry of Boonsboro, weather and vandalism reduced the monument to rubble. In that condition, it was used by the Union Army as a signal station during the Civil War.

First restoration
In 1882, the Odd Fellows Lodge of Boonsboro sponsored the tower's restoration. A canopy was added and a vehicle road built up the mountainside. A decade later, however, the tower again fell into ruin when a crack in the wall was not repaired.

State park
The Washington County Historical Society purchased the  site in 1920 and deeded it to the state for use as a state park in 1934.

CCC restoration
The tower was rebuilt in its present form by members of the Civilian Conservation Corps. Workers set in place the original cornerstone and a facsimile of the dedication tablet (pictured at right), and a third dedication ceremony was held on July 4, 1936.

Activities and amenities
The park offers access to the Appalachian Trail, picnicking facilities, and a museum with 
exhibits on the natural and cultural history of the area.

See also
Memorials dedicated to George Washington
Presidential memorials in the United States

References

External links

Washington Monument State Park Maryland Department of Natural Resources

State parks of Maryland
Parks in Washington County, Maryland
Monuments and memorials to George Washington in the United States
Monuments and memorials in Maryland
Mountain monuments and memorials
Buildings and structures in Washington County, Maryland
South Mountain Range (Maryland−Pennsylvania)
State parks of the Appalachians
Monuments and memorials on the National Register of Historic Places in Maryland
National Register of Historic Places in Washington County, Maryland
Buildings and structures completed in 1827
1827 establishments in Maryland
Civilian Conservation Corps in Maryland
Protected areas established in 1934
IUCN Category III